Alice Robie Resnick (born 1939) is an American attorney and jurist who served as a Justice of the Supreme Court of Ohio.

Career 
In 1988, she was the second woman in Ohio elected and third to serve on the state bench, and was reelected in 1994 and 2000. Her career has included experience as a private attorney, assistant county prosecutor, municipal judge, and as a judge on the Ohio Sixth District Court of Appeals.

One of her most controversial opinions was the 4–3 majority ruling that Ohio's school funding system was unconstitutional.

On January 17, 2006, Resnick announced that she would not seek a fourth term. She left office on January 1, 2007.

Resnick was selected in 1995 to the Ohio Women's Hall of Fame.

Personal life 

On January 31, 2005, she was arrested by the Ohio State Highway Patrol for DUI. Several motorists had used cell phones to call in a Jeep Grand Cherokee showing erratic driving. State police confronted her in a gas station and she refused a field sobriety test, resulting in the one-year automatic suspension of her license. After refusal, she ignored police orders to remain at the gas station and drove off. She was pulled over a few minutes later and failed a sobriety test. Justice Resnick registered a Blood Alcohol Concentration of 0.22, nearly three times the legal limit in the state of Ohio. A dashboard camera recorded the incident, and much of the audio showing Justice Resnick trying to use her office to get out of the DUI charge appeared on the internet. She was convicted of DUI, a first degree misdemeanor, required to take a three-day alcohol education program, and her license was suspended for six months, overriding the automatic suspension of one year. She was not charged with failure to comply with a police officer, resisting arrest, or fleeing from police. A new state law also implemented a mandatory jail sentence for offenders who refuse a sobriety test and show greater than a 0.17 BAC. The incident and penalty sparked a wave of public criticism, especially after portions of the 90-minute videotape surfaced on various internet video websites.

References

1939 births
Living people
Justices of the Ohio Supreme Court
American women judges
Judges of the Ohio District Courts of Appeals
Lawyers from Toledo, Ohio
Ohio politicians convicted of crimes
Siena Heights University alumni
University of Detroit Mercy alumni
Ohio Democrats
21st-century American women
20th-century American women judges
20th-century American judges
21st-century American women judges
21st-century American judges